Phillip Jerrod Heath (born December 18, 1979) is an American IFBB professional bodybuilder. He is a seven-time Mr. Olympia winner, having won the competition every year from 2011 to 2017. His latest victory tied him with Arnold Schwarzenegger for the joint-second number of all-time Mr. Olympia wins, behind Ronnie Coleman and Lee Haney, who are joint-first with eight wins each. His physique is considered one of the best and well balanced bodybuilding physiques of all time.

Early life
Phillip Jerrod Heath was born in Seattle, Washington, on December 18, 1979. He attended Rainier Beach High School in Seattle, where he was team captain and shooting guard on the varsity basketball team. He attended the University of Denver on an athletic scholarship, majoring in business administration while playing shooting guard for the university's Division I basketball team.

Bodybuilding career
Heath entered bodybuilding in 2002. In 2005, he won the overall title at the NPC (National Physique Committee) USA Championships, earning the right to compete as an IFBB Pro. He won his first two IFBB professional events the following year: The Colorado Pro Championships and The New York Pro Championship. In 2007, Heath placed fifth at the Arnold Classic. Although he still qualified to compete in the 2007 Mr. Olympia contest, Heath, nevertheless, decided not to enter the contest, stating that he needed additional time to improve his form.

Heath won the 2008 Iron Man show and placed second to Dexter Jackson at the 2008 Arnold Classic. In his 2008 Mr. Olympia debut, Heath finished third to become the first novice to place in the top three since Flex Wheeler in 1993. He claimed the fifth position at the 2009 Mr. Olympia title and second place at the 2010 event. He gained the crown in 2011. Heath defended the title of Mr Olympia consecutively six times since then until 2018 when he placed second to Shawn Rhoden.

Professional wrestling
During the countdown to TNA's Bound for Glory pre-show on October 20, 2013, Heath accompanied The BroMans (Jessie Godderz and Robbie E) to the ring for their tag team gauntlet match, which they won; later in the night, he accompanied them to their TNA World Tag Team Championship match against Gunner and James Storm. After the match, he celebrated their title victory with them in the ring and backstage during an interview.

Competitive history

2003 Northern Colorado State, Novice, Light-Heavyweight 1st and overall
2003 NPC Colorado State, Light-Heavyweight, 1st
2004 NPC Colorado State, Heavyweight, 1st and Overall
2005 NPC Junior Nationals, HeavyWeight, 1st and Overall
2005 NPC USA Championships, HeavyWeight, 1st and Overall
2006 Colorado Pro Championships, 1st
2006 New York Pro Championship, 1st
2007 Arnold Classic, 5th
2008 IFBB Iron Man, 1st
2008 Arnold Classic, 2nd
2008 Mr. Olympia, 3rd
2009 Mr. Olympia, 5th
2010 Arnold Classic, 2nd
2010 Mr. Olympia, 2nd
2011 Mr. Olympia, 1st
2011 Sheru Classic, 1st
2012 Mr. Olympia, 1st
 2012 Sheru Classic, 1st
2013 Mr. Olympia, 1st
 2013 Arnold Classic Europe, 1st
2014 Mr. Olympia, 1st
2015 Mr. Olympia, 1st
2016 Mr. Olympia, 1st
2017 Mr. Olympia, 1st
2018 Mr. Olympia, 2nd
2020 Mr. Olympia, 3rd

See also
List of male professional bodybuilders

References

External links

Phil Heath Posing Video from Arnold Classic 2007
Evolution of Bodybuilding

| colspan="3" style="text-align:center;"| Mr. Olympia
|-
| style="width:50%; text-align:center;"| Preceded by:Jay Cutler
| style="width:30%; text-align:center;"| Succeeded by:Shawn Rhoden

1979 births
Living people
African-American bodybuilders
American bodybuilders
Professional bodybuilders
Denver Pioneers men's basketball players
People from Seattle
American men's basketball players
21st-century African-American sportspeople
20th-century African-American sportspeople